The swimming competition at the 1979 Mediterranean Games was held in Split, Yugoslavia.

Medallists

Men's events

Women's events

Medal table

References
Complete 1979 Mediterranean report released by the International Mediterranean Games Committee

Mediterranean Games
Sports at the 1979 Mediterranean Games
1979